The Sobolev conjugate of p for , where n is space dimensionality, is

This is an important parameter in the Sobolev inequalities.

Motivation
More specifically, when does  control ? It is easy to check that the following inequality

    

can not be true for arbitrary q. Consider , infinitely differentiable function with compact support. Introduce . We have that:

The inequality (*) for  results in the following inequality for 

If  then by letting  going to zero or infinity we obtain a contradiction. Thus the inequality (*) could only be true for

,

which is the Sobolev conjugate.

See also
Sergei Lvovich Sobolev
 conjugate index

References
 Lawrence C. Evans. Partial differential equations. Graduate Studies in Mathematics, Vol 19. American Mathematical Society. 1998.  

Sobolev spaces